Phyllocnistis phrixopa is a moth of the family Gracillariidae, known from Maharashtra and Karnataka, India. The hostplants for the species include Casearia esculenta, and Casearia multinervosa.

References

Phyllocnistis
Endemic fauna of India
Moths of Asia